The Swamp Fox wooden roller coaster is located in Myrtle Beach, South Carolina, United States. It is one of 37 rides at Family Kingdom Amusement Park. The coaster is named after American Revolutionary War leader, Francis Marion.

In one experiment performed on the Swamp Fox, operators found that the train ran its track anywhere from eight to 10 seconds faster at 9 p.m. than it did around 2 p.m..

The Swamp Fox roller coaster, built by the Philadelphia Toboggan Company of Pennsylvania, opened in 1966 as one of the rides at Grand Strand Amusement Park. In 1992, that park was purchased by the Ammons family and rechristened "Family Kingdom Amusement Park".  The Swamp Fox was then totally refurbished according to the original specifications of the original design by John C. Allen. In 2016, American Coaster Enthusiasts marked the 50th anniversary of the Swamp Fox by adding a historical marker.

The Swamp Fox was declared a historic structure by the city in March 2017.

References

External links
 Review of the Swamp Fox Roller Coaster at TheCoasterCritic.com

Roller coasters introduced in 1966
Roller coasters in South Carolina